Westbury Senior High School is a ninth-through-12th-grade school of the Westbury Union Free School District (USFD No. 1), the district covering the village of Westbury, New York, USA.

Westbury High School serves 1,500 students from locations on and near the North Shore of Long Island, in Nassau County. It serves Westbury Village, New Cassel, New York and Old Westbury. Westbury High School is accredited by the Middle States Association of Colleges and Schools Commission on Secondary Schools.

As of the 2018–2019 school year, the school had an enrollment of 1,621 students and 102.8 classroom teachers (on an FTE basis), for a student–teacher ratio of 15.8:1. There were 1,238 students (76% of enrollment) eligible for free lunch.

Notable alumni
 Michael Cimino – Class of 1956, Yale University Class of 1961, film director, film producer, screenwriter, author
 Dennis DuVal – Class of 1970, Syracuse University Class of 1974, NBA basketball player (Washington Bullets), Hall of Fame athlete
 Joe DePre – Class of 1966, St. John's University Class of 1970, ABA basketball player (New York Nets 1971–1973)
 Gary Holder-Winfield – Class of 1991, Connecticut State Senator, 10th District
 Joel Ross - tennis player

References

External links
 Westbury High School website

Public high schools in New York (state)
Schools in Nassau County, New York